The Afrika Korps or German Africa Corps (}; DAK) was the German expeditionary force in Africa during the North African campaign of World War II. First sent as a holding force to shore up the Italian defense of its African colonies, the formation fought on in Africa, under various appellations, from March 1941 until its surrender in May 1943. The unit's best known commander was Field Marshal Erwin Rommel.

History

Organization
The Afrika Korps formed on 11 January 1941 and one of Adolf Hitler's favourite generals, Erwin Rommel, was designated as commander on 11 February. Originally Hans von Funck was to have commanded it, but Hitler loathed von Funck, as he had been a personal staff officer of Werner von Fritsch until von Fritsch was dismissed in 1938.

The German Armed Forces High Command (OKW) had decided to send a "blocking force" to Italian Libya to support the Italian army. The Italian 10th Army had been routed by the British Commonwealth Western Desert Force in Operation Compass (9 December 1940 – 9 February 1941) and captured at the Battle of Beda Fomm. The German blocking force, commanded by Rommel, at first consisted of a force based only on Panzer Regiment 5, which was put together from the second regiment of the 3rd Panzer Division. These elements were organized into the 5th Light Division when they arrived in Africa from 10 February – 12 March 1941. In late April and into May, the 5th Light Division was joined by elements of 15th Panzer Division, transferred from Italy. At this time, the Afrika Korps consisted of the two divisions, and was subordinated to the Italian chain of command in Africa.

On 15 August 1941, the German 5th Light Division was redesignated 21st Panzer Division, the higher formation of which was still the Afrika Korps. During the summer of 1941, the OKW increased the presence in Africa and created a new headquarters called Panzer Group Africa. On 15 August, the Panzer Group was activated with Rommel in command, and command of the Afrika Korps was turned over to Ludwig Crüwell. The Panzer Group comprised the Afrika Korps, with some additional German units now in North Africa, plus two corps of Italian units. The Panzer Group was, in turn, redesignated as Panzer Army Africa on 30 January 1942.

After the German and Italian defeat in the Second Battle of El Alamein and the Allied landings in Morocco and Algeria (Operation Torch), the OKW once more upgraded the presence in Africa by adding first the XC Army Corps, under Walter Nehring, in Tunisia on 19 November 1942, then an additional 5th Panzer Army on 8 December, under the command of Colonel-General Hans-Jürgen von Arnim.

On 23 February 1943, the original Panzer Army Africa, which had since been re-styled as the German-Italian Panzer Army, was now redesignated as the Italian 1st Army and put under the command of Italian general Giovanni Messe. Rommel, meanwhile, was placed in command of a new Army Group Africa, created to control both the Italian 1st Army and the 5th Panzer Army. The remnants of the Afrika Korps and surviving units of the 1st Italian Army retreated into Tunisia. Command of the Army Group was turned over to Arnim in March. On 13 May, the Afrika Korps surrendered, along with all other remaining Axis forces in North Africa.

Most Afrika Korps prisoners of war (POW) were transported to the United States and held in Camp Shelby in Mississippi, Camp Hearne in Texas and other POW camps until the end of the war.

Composition and terminology

When Rommel was promoted to the newly formed Panzer Army Africa, his command included a number of Italian units, including four infantry divisions. Two Italian armoured divisions, Ariete and Trieste, initially remained under Italian control as the Italian XX Motorized Corps under the command of General Gastone Gambara.

The Afrika Korps was restructured and renamed in August 1941. "Afrikakorps" was the official name of the force for less than six months but the officers and men used it for the duration.

Commanders
Erwin Rommel: 6 February 1941 - August 1941
Ludwig Crüwell: August 1941 - May 1942
Walther Nehring: May 1942 - September 1942
Wilhelm Ritter von Thoma: September 1942 - November 1942
 Unknown: November 1942 - May 1943

Treatment of local inhabitants and the Italian colonial government

The Afrika Korps gained a reputation by the Allies and by many historians as being magnanimous with Allied prisoners of war; since then many historians have used the term "War without hate" to describe the North African campaign as a whole. However, Jewish people suffered during the fascist regime laws, and the local administration took part in the Holocaust deporting some thousands of Jews to Italy, under the supervision of  Albert Kesselring, Wehrmacht commander of the Axis in the Mediterranean theater. Others suffered from forced labour and ill treatment at the hands of the Italian administration, including an Schutzstaffel and SD detachment. Robert Satloff described in his book Among the Righteous: Lost Stories from the Holocaust's Long Reach into Arab Lands that as the German and Italian forces retreated across Libya towards Tunisia, the Jewish population became victims upon which they released their anger and frustration. According to Satloff, Afrika Korps soldiers plundered Jewish property all along the Libyan coast. This violence and persecution only came to an end with the arrival of General Montgomery in Tripoli on 23 January 1943. Giordana Terracina writes that: "On April 3, the Italians recaptured Benghazi and a few months later the Afrika Korps led by Rommel was sent to Libya and began the deportation of the Jews of Cyrenaica in the concentration camp of Giado and other smaller towns in Tripolitania. This measure was accompanied by shooting, also in Benghazi, of some Jews guilty of having welcomed the British troops, on their arrival, treating them as liberators."

Re-forming of units
Certain divisions were re-formed in Europe after the cessation of fighting in Tunisia:
 15th Panzer Division (as 15th Panzergrenadier Division in Sicily, Italy and Western Front)
 21st Panzer Division (in France)
 Hermann Göring Panzer Division (in Sicily and Italy)
 90th Light Division (as 90th Panzergrenadier Division in Italy)

See also
 Fliegerführer Afrika
 Ramcke Parachute Brigade
 Western Desert Campaign
 László Almásy
 Operation Salaam

References

Sources

Further reading

Afrika
German units in Africa
Military units and formations established in 1941
Military units and formations disestablished in 1943